Aeranthes adenopoda is a species of orchid native to Madagascar. It was first described by H. Perrier in 1938. Its IUCN status is Not Evaluated.

References 

adenopoda
Orchids of Madagascar
Plants described in 1938
Taxa named by Joseph Marie Henry Alfred Perrier de la Bâthie